Dan DeLuca (born November 11, 1970) is an American actor, who is best known for appearing in The Wire.

Education and career 
DeLuca studied acting at the Herbert Berghof Studio in New York. He has a master's degree in business from Southeast Missouri State University.

DeLuca co-directed and produced the feature film Eco-Teens Save the World, with Academy Award Winner Shirley Jones and Emmy Nominee Corbin Bernsen. He is also the director of the feature film Two-Minute Heist. He was the writer, producer, and second unit director of the feature film Crazy Eights. He wrote and produced the feature film 'The Night Watchmen."

He is best known for his role in season 4 of HBO's The Wire, in which he portrays the real-life inspired character of Dr. David Parenti. The role partnered him with veteran actor Robert Wisdom as "Bunny Colvin."

DeLuca has also had roles in HBO's Veep and House of Cards.

In 2009 he won Best Actor and Best Director at The NYIIFF Festival. In 2014 he won Best Performance at the 2014 ZED Film Festival. Other awards include the 2015 Best Feature/Audience Award at the Alexandria International Film Festival, Best Feature at the Boston International Kids Family Festival, and Best Feature at the Louisville International Film Festival, for ''On The Wing.

Filmography

Film

References

External links

Living people
1970 births
American male actors
Place of birth missing (living people)